Mir Jumla II invaded the Ahom kingdom in January 1662 and left it in January–February 1663.  He was able to occupy Garhgaon, the Ahom capital, before the beginning of the rainy season, but he and his army were  confined mostly to Garhgaon and Madhupur during that period.  The Ahom king Sutamla had to take flight and hide in Namrup during Mir Jumla's occupation of the capital.  The defection of Baduli Phukan, a high ranking Ahom commander, precipitated the Treaty of Ghilajharighat in January 1663, with the Ahom king accepting tributary status.  Mir Jumla died on his way back before he could reach Dhaka, his capital.

Background
After Shah Jahan fell sick in 1658, the vassal ruler of Koch Bihar, Pran Narayan, threw off the Mughal yoke and began offensives in the east to recover territories in the erstwhile Koch Hajo.  Narayan attacked the Faujdar of Kamrup and Hajo, who retreated to Guwahati.  This confusion enabled the Ahoms to march against both the Mughals at Guwahati as well as Pran Narayan, and the Ahom kingdom took control of the region right up to the Sankosh river. During the Mughal succession war, Auranzeb's general Mir Jumla II pursued Shuja, a rival claimant of the Mughal throne, who escaped to the Arakan.  Mir Jumla was made the governor of Bengal and he sent Rashid Khan to recover the erstwhile Mughal territory in Kamrup.  The Ahoms fortified Jogighopa at Manas river in preparation against the Mughals.  Mir Jumla, in the meantime, took possession of Koch Bihar (Pran Narayan having fled to Bhutan) and began his march against the Ahoms on January 4, 1662.  The Ahom fortifications at Manas were easily overrun.

Mir Jumla's march toward Garhgaon
Mir Jumla divided his army into two and advanced east, one division along the north bank and the other along south bank of the Brahmaputra river. By February 4, 1662, Mir Jumla took possession of Guwahati.  The Ahoms took stand at Samdhara (under the Borgohain) and Simalugrah (under Bhitarual Gohain) in the north and south banks respectively.  Mir Jumla now transferred his entire army south and reached Simalugarh at the end of the month and overran it with some effort.  The attack so disheartened the Samdhara fort that it was abandoned in haste and the Borgohain adopted a scorched earth retreat.  After a night-long naval battle at Kaliabor, the Ahoms again fell back.  Mir Jumla then reached Salagrah, which too was abandoned.

Occupation of Garhgaon
Sutamla had no option but to take flight, leaving some riches in Garhgaon that fell into Mir Jumla's possession. Mir Jumla entered the capital on March 17, 1662.

Notes

References

 
 

Conflicts in 1662
Conflicts in 1663
1662 in India
17th century in the Ahom kingdom
1663 in India